Jurjen is a Dutch given name. Notable people with this name include:

 Jurjen Battjes (born 1939), Dutch civil engineer
 Jurjen Bosch (born 1985), Dutch football player
 Jurjen Ferdinand Koksma (1904–1964), Dutch mathematician
 Jurrie Koolhof (full name Jurjen) (born 1960), Dutch football player and manager

Dutch masculine given names